'Amrus ibn Yusuf al-Muwallad al-Laridi (died 808/9 or 813/4) was a Muwallad (probably of Visigothic origin) general of the Emirate of Córdoba and governor of Zaragoza.

Amrus, a native of Huesca, and his kinsman Shabrit were mawālī servants of Aysun ibn Sulayman al-Arabi, who was the son of the wali of Barcelona and Girona. The kinsmen joined Aysun's brother when Matruh al-Arabi rebelled and entered Zaragoza. In Muslim year 175 (AD 791/2), Amrus turned on his master, and he and Sarhabil ibn Saltan al-Zawagi attacked Matruh with swords, killing him. Amrus then went to Córdoba, where he was rewarded by being named wali of Talavera. In 802, he was sent from Toledo as general against another Zaragoza rebel, taking Zaragoza and Huesca, expelling Bahlul ibn Marzuq and fortifying a settlement that would become Tudela, installing there his son Yusuf ibn Amrus. Zaragoza again rebelled in December, 802, this time under Fortun ibn Musa, apparently a member of the Banu Qasi, and Amrus was in the year 803/804 appointed as governor of Zaragoza. He installed his kinsman, Sabrit, in Huesca. In 807, he quelled a rebellion in Tudela, and upon the death of Oriol of Aragon, he occupied the county of Sobrarbe, which was only regained by Aragon under Aznar Galíndez I in 814. This conforms with the timeline provided by the chronicler Al-Udri, who reports that Amrus held Zaragoza for 40 days short of ten years, placing his death in 198 (813/4), but al-Udri indicated that others place his death in 193 (808/809).

His family, the Banu Amrus, continued to be involved in the regional politics of the upper Ebro valley. Grandson Amrus ibn Umar ibn Amrus rebelled in Huesca in 870, capturing his cousin Lubb ibn Zakariyya ibn Amrus, and killing the amil Musa ibn Galind, allying himself with the amil 's paternal uncle García Íñiguez of Pamplona. However, he shortly was enticed to return to Cordoban loyalty, being made governor of Toledo. Also active at this time were his brother Zakariyya ibn Umar, his uncle Zakariyya ibn Amrus and the latter's son Umar ibn Zakariyya. Mas'ud ibn Amrus, son of Amrus ibn Umar, was the last of the family, being killed in 884 by kinsman Muhammad al-Tawil of Huesca, a member of the Banu Sabrit, the descendants of the kinsman and ally of Amrus ibn Yusuf. Muhammad founded a family known as the Banu al-Tawil that would rule what was effectively a short-lived taifa state at Huesca in the late 9th and early 10th century before themselves being supplanted by the Banu Tujib of Zaragoza.

Family tree 

{{tree chart|MaT  | |MiW  | |ZiI  | |AiI  | |AbI  | |Mas
    |MaT=Muhammadal-Tawil'|MiW=Muhammadibn Walid|ZiI=Zakariyyaibn Isa|AiI=Asbagibn Isa|AbI=Abd al-Malikibn Isa|Mas=Mas'ud IbnAmrus
    |boxstyle_MaT=background-color: #faa;
    |boxstyle_MiW=background-color: #faa;
    |boxstyle_ZiI=background-color: #faa;
    |boxstyle_AiI=background-color: #faa;
    |boxstyle_AbI=background-color: #faa;
    |boxstyle_Mas=background-color: #D2C9A2;}}

 Sources 
Alberto Cañada Juste, "Los Banu Qasi (714-924)", in Principe de Viana, vol. 41, pp. 5–95 (1980).
Fernando de la Granja, "La Marca Superior en la Obra de al-'Udrí", Estudios de la Edad Media de la Corona de Aragón, vol. 8 (1967), pp. 457–545
Évariste Lévi-Provençal, Histoire de l'Espagne musulmane'' (1944-1953).

References

9th-century people from al-Andalus
9th-century deaths
Year of birth unknown
Upper March
8th-century people from al-Andalus
Al-Andalus military personnel